William N. Bowman (born 1868 in Carthage, New York, d. August 28, 1944 in Denver) was a prolific architect in Colorado.

He was born in 1868 in Carthage, New York.  As the eldest of five children, he had to quit school at age 11 to work in a woolen mill, in order to support the family after his father was injured.  Hoping to become an architect and builder, he studied math and drawing at night, at a schoolteacher's home.  He first worked at an architect's office in Jackson, Michigan.  Detroit architect Col. Elijah E. Myers recommended he do a carpenter's apprenticeship, which he did.  He later worked for architects Mortimer L. Smith & Son in Detroit and Thurtle & Fleming in Indianapolis.  And then was a member of Rush, Bowman & Rush, a construction firm.

In the main part of his career he worked as an architect in Denver and designed buildings statewide.  He designed more than 30 buildings in Denver alone.
He was president of Colorado's chapter of the American Institute of Architects during 1917–1919. He died in 1944 at his home in one of his works, the Norman Apartments in Denver, and was buried
in Fairmount Cemetery.

Notable works include (with attribution):
Douglas City Hall (1915), 130 S. Third St., Douglas, WY (Bowman, W.N.), NRHP-listed
Yavapai County Courthouse (1916), Courthouse Sq., Prescott, AZ (Bowman, William N.), NRHP-listed
Weld County Courthouse (1917), 9th St. and 9th Ave., Greeley, CO (Bowman, W.N.), NRHP-listed
Scotts Bluff County Courthouse (1920), 10th and Q Sts., Gering, NE (Bowman, William N.), NRHP-listed
State Office Building (1921), NE corner of East Colfax and Sherman, Denver, neoclassical
Fairplay Hotel (1922), 500 Main St., Fairplay, CO (Bowman, William N.), NRHP-listed
Montrose County Courthouse (1923), 320 S. 1st St., Montrose, CO (William Bowman Company), NRHP-listed 
Colorado Building (1925), 401–411 N. Main St., Pueblo, CO (Bowman, William N., Co.), NRHP-listed
McCook YMCA (1925), 424 Norris Ave., McCook, NE (Bowman, William N. Co.), NRHP-listed
Greeley Masonic Temple (1927), 829 10th Ave., Greeley, CO (Bowman, William N.), NRHP-listed 
Mountain States Telephone Building (1929), 931 14th St. Denver, CO (Bowman, William N.), NRHP-listed

Adams State Teachers College buildings, Alamosa, Colorado
William Norman Bowman House-Yamecila, 325 King St., Denver, CO (Bowman, William Norman), NRHP-listed 
Byers and Cole Junior High Schools, Denver
 The Colburn Hotel, 980 Grant St., Denver, NRHP-listed
Denver City and County Building, Denver
El Jebel Shrine and the clubhouse, Denver (with T. Robert Wieger)
Koerner House, 1824 S. Mount Vernon St., Spokane, WA (Bowman, William), NRHP-listed
Norman Apartments, 99 S. Downing St., Denver, CO (Bowman, William Norman), NRHP-listed
Park Hill Methodist Church, Denver
One or more works in Greeley Downtown historic district, roughly bounded by 8th St., 8th Ave., 10th St., and 9th Ave. Greeley, CO (Bowman, William N.), NRHP-listed

References

Architects from Denver
19th-century American architects
1868 births
1944 deaths
People from Carthage, New York
Burials at Fairmount Cemetery (Denver, Colorado)
20th-century American architects